Xavier Velasco (born 1964) is a Mexican writer. He was born in Mexico City. He won the 2003 Premio Alfaguara for his novel Diablo Guardián.

References 

Mexican male novelists
Mexican male writers
1964 births
Living people